An album (Latin: albus, "white"), in ancient Rome, was a board chalked or painted white, on which decrees, edicts and other public notices were inscribed in black.

History
The Annales maximi of the Pontifex maximus, the annual edicts of the praetor, the lists of Roman and municipal senators (decuriones) and jurors (album indicum) were exhibited in this manner. The Acta Diurna, a sort of daily government gazette, containing an officially authorized narrative of noteworthy events in Rome was also published this way.

Legacy
The medieval and modern meaning of album, as a book of blank pages in which verses, autographs, sketches, photographs and the like are collected, derives from the Roman use. This in turn led to the modern meaning of an album as a collection of audio recordings issued as a single item on CD, record, audio tape or another medium.

Another deviation is also applied to the official list of matriculated students in a university, and to the roll in which a bishop inscribes the names of the diocese's clergy. In law, the word is the equivalent of mailles blanches, for rent paid in silver ("white") money.

Notes

References

Society of ancient Rome
Latin words and phrases